Captain Tahawwur Hussain Rana (born 12 January 1961) is a Pakistani former military doctor who served in the Pakistan Army. He moved to Canada after gaining citizenship and became an immigration service businessman. 

In 2011, he was convicted of providing support to the militant group Lashkar-e-Taiba and of allegedly plotting an attack on the Danish newspaper Jyllands-Posten.
He was however not found guilty of involvement in the 2008 Mumbai attacks, a charge for which he was originally detained.  Expressing disappointment at the verdict the Government of India stated that National Investigative Agency would charge Rana in a court in Delhi. On 17 January 2013 he was sentenced to 14 years in prison. A US court has denied the bail plea of Pakistani-origin Canadian businessman Tahawwur Rana, a key accused in the 2008 Mumbai terror attack and declared a fugitive by India, asserting that he has not negated the "risk of flight"

Personal life
Tahawwur Hussain Rana was born and raised in Chichawatni in the province of Punjab, Pakistan. He attained his education from the Cadet College Hasan Abdal, a military residential college in Pakistan (where he met and befriended David Headley, then still known as Daood Gilani). A physician by profession, Rana served as a captain general duty practitioner in the Pakistan Army Medical Corps. He and his wife, who is also a physician, immigrated to Canada in 1997,  and obtained Canadian citizenship in June 2001. He lived primarily in Chicago and owns several businesses including an immigration service agency, First World Immigration Services, with offices in Chicago, New York and Toronto. He also owns a home in Ottawa where his father and brother stay.

His younger brother Abbas Rana is a journalist with The Hill Times and had been reporting on politics and the Canadian parliament for seven years. Abbas says his brother is innocent and has no links with terrorism; "To the best of my knowledge, these charges are false. I know my brother. I love my brother. He’s a man of integrity, he’s honest, and he’s a hard-working person."
Rana's arrest had a devastating impact on the family. Writing under the heading "Why The Hill Times supports its reporter, Abbas Rana," the weekly's publisher said "As I read about his brother’s case in news stories from Chicago, to India, to Canada, I can’t help but notice the innuendo that appears to imply guilt in the reporting on allegations of terrorism."

When the story of Rana'a arrest broke out in American media, the news was kept hidden from his father who is in poor health. His father, who views cable news, was purposely shielded from watching news. When he gradually learned of the story, he became hospitalised. While serving at the Siachen glacier as a medical doctor, Rana got sick and was hospitalized suffering from pulmonary edema.

He claims that he had contact with Major Iqbal, an alleged ISI official, who promised him he would try to get Rana back on Pakistan, on the condition if Rana helped Iqbal’s friend (Headley) get back to Pakistan. Based on this, Rana's lawyer said Rana had no knowledge of the Mumbai attack and that Headley happened to manipulate Rana’s immigration business as a cover for his visits to Mumbai. In the same interrogation, Rana also testified that Headley may have possibly worked for the  Lashkar-e-Taiba and been involved in militancy in Kashmir.

Arrest
Rana and Headley were charged and arrested on 18 October 2009 for plotting attacks on the offices of Jyllands-Posten, the newspaper which published the controversial cartoons of prophet Mohammad. During the subsequent interrogation, it was found out that Rana had traveled to Mumbai and had stayed in Taj Mahal Palace & Tower, one of the places which was attacked by terrorists for over four days in November 2008. His trial commenced on 16 May 2011 in Chicago, Illinois. However, Rana maintains that he visited India with his wife on the pretext of interviewing people wishing to emigrate to Canada and the US, as part of his immigration consultancy business.

Rana and his family say he is a pacifist and has been duped, cheated and framed by Headley.

Trial
The opening statements of the trial were made on 23 May 2011 in Chicago.  Key testimony at the trial was provided by a Government witness and Rana's childhood friend Headley, who also provided details of Pakistan's Inter-Services Intelligence support for Lashkar-e-Taiba.  On 9 June 2011 a jury convicted him of supporting terrorism by providing material support to Lashkar-e-Taiba and planning an aborted plot to bomb a Danish newspaper, Jyllands-Posten.  He was acquitted of the third charge of involvement in the 2008 Mumbai attacks.  He faced up to 30 years in prison.

In January, 2013, Rana was sentenced to 14 years in prison.

References

External links
Chicago Businessman Tahawwur Hussain Rana Guilty of Providing Material Support to Terror Group and Supporting Role in Denmark Terrorism Conspiracy, FBI press release
CHICAGOANS TAHAWWUR RANA AND DAVID HEADLEY INDICTED FOR ALLEGED ROLES IN INDIA AND DENMARK TERRORISM CONSPIRACIES;ILYAS KASHMIRI AND RETIRED PAKISTANI MAJOR CHARGED IN DENMARKPLOT, USDOJ statement
Q&A: Tahawwur Rana trial, BBC, 2011-05-23

1961 births
Living people
Participants in the 2008 Mumbai attacks
Cadet College Hasan Abdal alumni
Canadian prisoners and detainees
People associated with the Jyllands-Posten Muhammad cartoons controversy
Canadian emigrants to the United States
Pakistani military doctors
People from Chichawatni
People from Chicago
Military personnel from Ottawa
Canadian people of Punjabi descent
Pakistani emigrants to Canada
Naturalized citizens of Canada
Pakistan Army officers
People associated with the 2008 Mumbai attacks
Fugitives wanted by India
Fugitives wanted on terrorism charges
People convicted on terrorism charges
Lashkar-e-Taiba members